The acronym CARF can mean multiple things:

Campaign Against Racism and Fascism, a British pressure group
Canadian Amateur Radio Federation
Commission on Accreditation of Rehabilitation Facilities